Maithili Sharan Gupt (3 August 1886 – 12 December 1964) was one of the most important modern Hindi poets. He is considered one among the pioneers of Khari Boli (plain dialect) poetry and wrote in Khari Boli dialect, at a time when most Hindi poets favoured the use of Braj Bhasha dialect. He was a recipient of the third highest (then second highest) Indian civilian honour of Padma Bhushan. For his book Bharat-Bharati (1912), widely quoted during India's freedom struggle, he was given the title of Rashtra Kavi by Mahatma Gandhi.

Early life 
He was born in Chirgaon, Jhansi in Uttar Pradesh in the Kankane clan of the Gahoi Baniya community in a family that was once a wealthy zamindar family, but the wealth was lost by the time he was born. His father was Seth Ramcharan Gupta and mother's name was Kashibai. Both his father and his brother Shearamsharan Gupta were prominent poets. He disliked school as a child, so his father arranged for his education at their home. As a child, Gupt studied Sanskrit, English and Bengali. Mahavir Prasad Dwivedi was his mentor. He married in 1895.

Literary works 
Gupt entered the world of Hindi literature by writing poems in various magazines, including Saraswati. In 1910, his first major work, Rang mein Bhang was published by Indian Press. With Bharat Bharati, his nationalist poems became popular among Indians, who were struggling for independence. Most of his poems revolve around plots from Ramayana, Mahabharata, Buddhist stories and the lives of famous religious leaders. His famous work Saket revolves around Urmila, wife of Lakshmana, from Ramayana, while another of his works Yashodhara revolves around Yashodhara, the wife of Gautama Buddha.

प्राण न पागल हो तुम यों, पृथ्वी पर वह प्रेम कहाँ..

मोहमयी छलना भर है, भटको न अहो अब और यहाँ..

ऊपर को निरखो अब तो बस मिलता है चिरमेल वहाँ..

Creative style 

His works are based along patriotic themes, among others poets such as Ramdhari Singh Dinkar and Makhanlal Chaturvedi. His poetry is characterized by non-rhyming couplets in Khadi Boli. Although the couplet structure is non rhyming, the prominent use of alliterations lends a rhythmic backdrop due to the rhythmic alterations between vowels and consonants. He was a religious man, and this can be seen in his works.

Major works 
Poetry:
 Saket(1931)
 Rang mein Bhang(1905)
 Matrubhumi
 Bharat-Bharati(1912)
 Jayadrath Vadh(1910)
 Vikat Bhat
 Plassey ka Yuddha
 Gurukul
 Kisan
 Panchavati(1925)
 Nirjhar
 Yashodhara(1932)
 Manushyata
 Kirano ka khel
 Dvapar(1936)
 Anagh(1928)

Political career 
After India got independence in 1947, he was also made an honorary member of the Rajya Sabha, where he used poetry to put his opinions before the other members. He remained a member of the Rajya Sabha till his death in 1964. He was awarded Padma Bhushan in 1954.

See also
 List of Hindi-language poets

References

External links 
 Maithili Sharan Gupt at Kavita Kosh
Three poems of the poet from Bharat Bharati are available for readers at www.geeta-kavita.com

1886 births
20th-century Indian poets
Hindi-language poets
People from Jhansi district
Recipients of the Padma Bhushan in literature & education
M
20th-century Indian translators
Translators to Hindustani
Hindi-language writers
Translators of Omar Khayyám
Poets from Uttar Pradesh
Rashtrakavi
Indian male poets
1964 deaths